The Richard S. Irwin Barn, also referred to as Cheadle Barn, is a historic agricultural building located in rural Benton County, Oregon, United States.

The barn was purchased by the United States Fish and Wildlife Service in 1965, and is part of the William L. Finley National Wildlife Refuge. It was listed on the National Register of Historic Places in 1988.

It has a prominent hay hood.

See also
National Register of Historic Places listings in Benton County, Oregon

References

External links

1900 establishments in Oregon
Barns in Oregon
Barns with hay hoods
Barns on the National Register of Historic Places in Oregon
Buildings and structures in Corvallis, Oregon
Infrastructure completed in 1900
National Register of Historic Places in Benton County, Oregon